The 1967 Eastern Illinois Panthers football team represented Eastern Illinois University as a member of the Interstate Intercollegiate Athletic Conference (IIAC) during the 1967 NCAA College Division football season. The team was led by third-year head coach Clyde Biggers and played their home games at Lincoln Field in Charleston, Illinois. The Panthers finished the season with a 2–6–1 record overall and a 1–2 record in conference play.

Schedule

References

Eastern Illinois
Eastern Illinois Panthers football seasons
Eastern Illinois Panthers football